Among those interred at the Montparnasse Cemetery in Paris are:

A
 Henri Alekan (1909–2001), cinematographer
 Alexander Alekhine (1892–1946), Russian-born chess world champion
 Grace Alekhine (1876–1956), artist and chess master
 Michèle Arnaud (1919–1998), singer
 Henry Aron (1842–1885), journalist and political essayist
 Raymond Aron (1905–1983), philosopher, sociologist and political scientist
 Jean-Michel Atlan (1913–1960), poet and painter
 Tina Aumont (1946–2006), actress, daughter of Jean-Pierre Aumont and Maria Montez
 Georges Auric (1899–1983), composer, member of Les Six

B

 Shapour Bakhtiar (1914–1991), last prime minister of the constitutional monarchy in Iran
 César Baldaccini (1921–1988), sculptor
 Théodore de Banville (1823–1891), poet, writer
 Frédéric Bartholdi (1834–1904), sculptor of the Statue of Liberty (Liberty Enlightening the World)
 Maryse Bastié (1898–1952), pioneer aviator
 Pierre Batcheff (1901–1932), actor
 Jane Bathori (1877–1970), opera singer
 Charles Baudelaire (1821–1867), poet
 Jean Baudrillard (1929–2007), French cultural theorist, philosopher, political commentator, and photographer
 Simone de Beauvoir (1908–1986), feminist philosopher and author
 Jacques Becker (1906–1960), filmmaker
 Samuel Beckett (1906–1989), Irish author, playwright and poet
 Eugène Belgrand (1810–1878), civil engineer
 Jean-Paul Belmondo (1933–2021), actor
 Paul Belmondo (1898–1982), French sculptor
 Jean Béraud (1849–1935), painter
 Emmanuel Berl (1892–1976), writer
 Aloysius Bertrand (1807–1841), poet
 Marcel Alexandre Bertrand (1847–1907), geologist, one of the founders of modern tectonics
 Jean-Marie Beurel (1813–1872), catholic priest
 Louis Gustave Binger (1856–1936), explorer
 Lucien Bodard (1914–1998), journalist
 Marc Boegner (1881–1970), theologist and academician
 Jean-Marie Bonnassieux (1810–1892), sculptor
 Aristide Boucicaut (1810–1877), entrepreneur and creator of Le Bon Marché chain of department stores
 William-Adolphe Bouguereau (1825–1905), artist (painter in realist style)
 Antoine Jacques Claude Joseph, comte Boulay de la Meurthe (1761–1840), statesman
 Antoine Bourdelle (1861–1921), sculptor and teacher
 Paul Bourget (1852–1935), writer
 Marcel Bozzuffi (1928–1988), actor
 Gérard Brach (1927–2006), screenwriter
 Constantin Brâncuși (1876–1957), Romanian sculptor
 Brassaï (born Gyula Halász) (1899–1984), photographer
 Paul Broca (1824–1880), physician and anatomist
 Charles-Édouard Brown-Séquard (1817–1894), physician
 Jean Bruller (1902–1991), author who wrote under the nom de plume of Vercors

C

 René Capitant (1901–1970), lawyer and statesman
 Roger Caillois (1913–1978), author
 Jean Carmet (1920–1994), actor
 Isabelle Caro (1982–2010), model
 Eugène Carrière (1849–1906), Symbolist painter
 Rene Cassin (1887–1976), jurist, Nobel Laureate. His remains were later transferred to the Panthéon.
 Sergio de Castro (artist) (1922–2012), Argentinian painter, musician and poet
 Cornelius Castoriadis (1922–1997), Greek philosopher with French citizenship
 Aristide Cavaillé-Coll (1811–1899), organ builder
 Emmanuel Chabrier (1841–1894), composer
 René de Chambrun (1906–2002), lawyer, businessman.
 Honoré Champion (1846–1913), publisher
 Claude François Chauveau-Lagarde (1756–1841), lawyer, defender of Marie-Antoinette
 Marie-Dominique Chenu (1895–1990), Catholic theologian
 Jacques Chirac (1932–2019), politician, Prime Minister of France, Mayor of Paris, President of France, Co-Prince of Andorra
 Emil Cioran (1911–1995), Romanian philosopher
 André Citroën (1878–1935), founded France's Citroën automobile factory
 Antoni Clavé (1913–2005), artist
 Yves Congar (1904–1995), Catholic theologian
 François Coppée (1842–1908), poet and novelist
 Gaspard-Gustave Coriolis (1792–1843), mathematician
 Margaret Cossaceanu-Lavrillier (1893–1980), sculptor
 Julio Cortázar (1914–1984), Argentinian author
 Antoine Augustin Cournot (1801–1877), economist
 Maurice Couve de Murville (1907–1999), former Prime Minister of France
 Bruno Cremer (1929–2010), actor
 Adolphe Crémieux (1796–1880), lawyer and statesman
 Charles Cros (1842–1888), poet and inventor

D

 Jules Dalou (1838–1902), sculptor
 Mireille Darc (1938–2017), model and actress
 Gabriel Davioud (1824–1881), architect
 Pierre David-Weill (1900–1975), banker, Chairman of Lazard Frères
 Suzanne Dechevaux-Dumesnil (1900–1989), lover and, later, wife of Samuel Beckett
 Jos De Cock (1934–2010), Belgian-French painter, watercolorist, etcher and sculptor and, later, wife of Pierre Restany
 Jacques Demy (1931–1990), film director
 Édouard Deperthes (1833–1898), architect
 Paul Deschanel (1855–1922), former President of France
 Robert Desnos (1900–1945), Surrealist poet
 Porfirio Díaz (1830–1915), longest serving Mexican President, Dictator, General
 Marie Dorval (1798–1849), actress
 Alfred Dreyfus (1859–1935), Jewish military officer falsely accused of treason (the Dreyfus affair)
 Jules Dumont d'Urville (1790–1842), explorer of South Pacific & discoverer of Venus de Milo
 Marguerite Duras (1914–1996), author and movie director
 Émile Durkheim (1858–1917), sociologist
 Henri Dutilleux (1916–2013), composer
 Roland Dyens (1955–2016), guitarist and composer

E
 Émile Egger (1813–1885), philologist
 Robert Enrico (1931–2001), film director
 Antoine Étex (1808–1888), sculptor

F
 Henri Fantin-Latour (1836–1904), artist
 Léon-Paul Fargue (1876–1947), poet and essayist
 Paul Foucher (1810–1875), dramatist and journalist
 César Franck (1822–1890), composer and organist
 Othon Friesz (1879–1949), painter
 Carlos Fuentes (1928–2012), Mexican writer

G
 Serge Gainsbourg (1928–1991), singer and composer
 Évariste Galois (1811–1832), mathematician and revolutionary
 Charles Garnier (1825–1898), designed the original Paris Opera House for Napoleon III
 Henry Gauthier-Villars (1859–1931), writer and first husband of Colette
 François Gérard (1770–1837), artist
 Jean Giraud (1938–2012), illustrator, comic artist, also known as Moebius
 Alexandre Guilmant (1837–1911), organist and composer
 Mavis Gallant (1922–2014), author
 Grigori Andreevich Gershuni (1870–1908), revolutionary

H
 Jean Nicolas Pierre Hachette (1769–1834), mathematician
 Clara Haskil (1895–1960), Romanian pianist
 Swan Hennessy (1866–1929), Irish-American composer, and his son Patrice Hennessy (1910–1973), French man of letters
 Pierre-Jules Hetzel (1814–1886), publisher and literary editor
 Jean-Antoine Houdon (1741–1828), famous sculptor of notable men
 Joris-Karl Huysmans (1848–1907), author

I
 Vincent d'Indy (1851–1931), composer
 Eugène Ionesco (1909–1994), Romanian playwright
 Jean-Robert Ipoustéguy (1920–2006), French sculptor
 Joris Ivens (1898–1989), Dutch filmmaker

J
 Jean Bernard Jauréguiberry (1815–1887), admiral and statesman
 Joëlle (1953–1982), American-born French singer
 Geneviève Joy (1919–2009), French classical and modernist pianist

K
 Gustave Kahn, (1859–1936), poet and art critic
 Joseph Kessel (1898–1979), writer
 Kiki (1901–1953), singer, actress, painter, "Queen of Montparnasse" (although she was probably buried in Thiais)
 Adamantios Korais (1748–1833), Greek writer and philosopher
 Cornelius Castoriadis (1922–1997), Greek writer and philosopher

L

 Bernard Lacoste (1931–2006), president of Lacoste apparel company, son of René Lacoste
 Jean-Baptiste Lamarck (1744–1829), naturalist and zoologist (unearthed in 1834, lost body)
 Paul-Gilbert Langevin (1933–1986), musicologist
 Henri Langlois (1914–1977), film preservationist
 Pierre Larousse (1817–1875), author of encyclopedia  Larousse Gastronomique
 Henri Laurens (1885–1954), sculptor, engraver
 Pierre Laval (1883–1945), Prime Minister.
 Alphonse Laveran (1845–1922), physician, parasitologist
 Maurice Leblanc (1864–1941), creator of Arsène Lupin, novelist
 Charles Marie René Leconte de Lisle (1818–1894), poet
 Alexandre Lenoir (1761–1839), archaeologist
 Philippe Léotard (1940–2001), teacher, actor, poet, singer
 Urbain Le Verrier (1811–1877), astronomer and mathematician
 André Lhote (1885–1962), painter and sculptor
 Jacques Lisfranc (1790–1847), gynecologist and surgeon
 Émile Littré (1801–1881) lexicographer, philosopher
 Baltasar Lobo (1910–1993), Spanish sculptor
 Sylvia Lopez (1931–1959), actress
 Herbert Lottman (1927–2014), American biographer
 Louis Loucheur (1872–1931), statesman
 Pierre Louÿs (1870–1925), poet, romance novelist

M
 Ambrose Dudley Mann (1801–1889), Commissioner of the Confederate States of America for Belgium and the Vatican
 René Maran (1887–1960), intellectual, author
 Chris Marker (1921–2012), filmmaker, writer, photographer
 Gaston Maspero (1846–1916), Egyptologist
 Guy de Maupassant (1850–1893), author
 Rosita Mauri (1849–1923), principal ballerina at the Paris Opera
 Claude Mauriac (1914–1996), author
 René Mayer (1895–1972), former Prime Minister of France
 Catulle Mendès (1841–1909), poet, man of letters
 Adah Isaacs Menken (1835–1868), actress, poet
 Ricardo Menon (1952–1989), artist, assistant and friend of Niki de Saint Phalle (who designed the tomb: Chat de Ricardo, one of the most notable sculptures in the cemetery).
 André Meyer (1898–1979), French/American financier
 Charles-Joseph Minard (1781–1870), French data visualization pioneer
 Mireille (1906–1996), singer, composer
 Eliane Montel (1898–1992), physicist and Paul Langevin's partner
 Maria Montez (1912–1951), actress
 Vincent de Moro-Giafferi (1878–1956), lawyer and statesman
 Michèle Morgan (1920–2016), actress
 Jean Mounet-Sully (1841–1916), actor
 Philippe Muray (1945–2006), essayist and novelist

N
 Philippe Noiret (1930–2006), actor
 Max Nordau (1849–1923), Zionist leader, physician, author

O

 Mathieu Orfila (1787–1853), toxicologist, chemist
 Gérard Oury (1919–2006), director

P

 Pan Yuliang (1895–1977), Chinese painter
 Jean-Claude Pascal (1927–1992), singer and actor
 Adolphe Pégoud (1889–1915), aviator
 Auguste Perret (1874–1954), architect
 Bénédicte Pesle (1927–2018), arts patron.
 Symon Petliura (1879–1926), Ukrainian leader
 Maurice Pialat (1925–2003), film director
 Charles Pigeon (1838–1915), engineer, inventor and manufacturer
 Jules Henri Poincaré, (1854–1912), mathematician and physicist
 Jean Poiret (1926–1992), actor, film director
 Nicos Poulantzas (1936–1979), sociologist
 François Charles Henri Laurent Pouqueville (1770–1838), diplomat, writer, historian, archaeologist, physician
 Pierre-Joseph Proudhon, (1809–1865), philosopher and statesman
 Visarion Puiu (1879–1964), Romanian metropolitan bishop

Q

 Edgar Quinet (1803–1875), historian

R
 Tania Rachevskaia (????–1910), a Russian medical student (and allegedly an anarchist). Her grave is famous because it is adorned with The Kiss by Constantin Brâncuși
 Denis Auguste Marie Raffet (1804–1860), painter
 Jean-Pierre Rampal (1922–2000), flautist
 Fanny Raoul (1771–1833), feminist writer, journalist, philosopher and essayist
 Man Ray (1890–1976), American-born Dada and Surrealist artist and photographer, with his wife Juliet
 Serge Reggiani (1922–2004), singer, actor
 Jean-Marc Reiser (1941–1983), comic artist
 Rosalie Rendu (1786–1856), daughter of charity
 Pierre Restany (1930–2003), art critic
 Paul Reynaud (1878–1966), lawyer and statesman
 Yves Robert (1920–2002), actor, director
 Yves Rocard (1903–1992), physicist
 Éric Rohmer (1920–2010), film director
 Nicolae Rosetti-Bălănescu (1827–1884), Romanian politician
 Frédéric Rossif (1922–1990), filmmaker
 Gustave Roussy (1874–1948), Swiss-born neuropathologist and oncologist
 François Rude (1784–1855), sculptor
 Julio Ruelas (1870–1907), Mexican painter
 Heinrich Daniel Ruhmkorff (1803–1877), German inventor

S

 Jean Sablon (1906–1994), singer
 Charles Augustin Sainte-Beuve (1804–1869), literary critic, author
 Camille Saint-Saëns (1835–1921), composer & performer of Romantic classical music
 Jules Sandeau (1811–1883), novelist
 Jean-Paul Sartre (1905–1980), French philosopher & novelist
 Claude Sautet (1924–2000), film director
 Georges Schehadé (1905–1989), Lebanese poet and playwright
 Jean Seberg (1938–1979), American actress and civil rights activist
 Pierre Seghers (1906–1987), poet and editor
 Delphine Seyrig (1932–1990), actress
 Susan Sontag (1933–2004), American author and philosopher
 Jesús Rafael Soto (1923–2005), Venezuelan kinetic sculptor and painter
 Chaïm Soutine (1893–1943), painter of the School of Paris

T
 Boris Taslitzky (1911–2005), painter
 Augustin Thierry (1795–1856), historian
 Roland Topor (1938–1997), writer, illustrator
 Henri Troyat (1911–2007), author
 Tristan Tzara (1896–1963), Romanian Dadaist poet and essayist

U
 Stanisław Ulam (1909–1984), Polish mathematician, with his wife Françoise Aron Ulam.

V
 Carlos Valenti (1888–1912), painter
 César Vallejo (1892–1938), Peruvian poet
 Agnès Varda (1928–2019), filmmaker
 Jacques Vergès (1925–2013), lawyer
 Louis Veuillot (1813–1883), journalist
 Paul Vidal de la Blache (1845–1918), geographer
 Louis Vierne (1870–1937), composer, organist
 Andrée Viollis (1870–1950), journalist and writer

W
 Henri-Alexandre Wallon (1812–1904), historian, statesman
 Adolphe Willette (1857–1926), painter
 Bronisława Wieniawa-Długoszowska (1886–1953), buried under the name 'Jeanne-Liliane Lalande'. She spied for French military intelligence during the Bolshevik revolution.
 Georges Wolinski (1934–2015) Political cartoonist; writer; assassinated at Charlie Hebdo January 7, 2015

Z
 Ossip Zadkine (1890–1967), Russian-born sculptor and artist
 Sabine Zlatin (1907–1996), Polish-born humanitarian who hid Jewish children during the Holocaust

References

External links

 A list of many buried at the cemetery
 Cimetière de Montparnasse at Find A Grave
 Information and help in touring Montparnasse cemetery In English

 
Montparnasse Cemetery
burials at Montparnasse Cemetery